Siorac-en-Périgord is a railway station in Siorac-en-Périgord, Nouvelle-Aquitaine, France. The station is located on the Niversac - Agen and Siorac-en-Périgord - Cazoulès railway lines. The station is served by TER (local) services operated by SNCF.

Train services
The following services currently call at Siorac-en-Périgord:
local service (TER Nouvelle-Aquitaine) Bordeaux - Libourne - Bergerac - Sarlat-la-Canéda
local service (TER Nouvelle-Aquitaine) Périgueux - Le Buisson - Monsempron-Libos - Agen
local service (TER Nouvelle-Aquitaine) Périgueux - Le Buisson - Sarlat-la-Canéda

References

Railway stations in France opened in 1863
Railway stations in Dordogne